Alexei Gennadyevich Dyumin (born 28 August 1972) is a Russian politician, serving as Governor of Tula Oblast since 2016. Previously he served as President Vladimir Putin's chief security guard and assistant before being promoted to lead the Russian military's Special Operations Forces, where he oversaw the annexation of Crimea in 2014. The following year, he became Deputy Minister of Defense of the Russian Federation. He holds the rank of lieutenant general and is a recipient of the Hero of the Russian Federation title.

Life and career
Alexei Dyumin was born August 28, 1972, in Kursk.

His father, Gennady Vasilyevich Dyumin, is a military medic and general, who heads the 4th Department of the Main Military Medical Department of the Ministry of Defence. As a child, Dyumin's family lived in both Kaluga and Voronezh as a result of his father's military transferrals.

His mother worked as a teacher.

His younger brother, Artyom, is a businessman who heads JSC TPK "Prodmarket" as well as LLC "Turbo."

In 1994, he graduated from Voronezh Higher Military Engineering School of Radio Electronics. The school was a part of the Moscow Military District, which was engaged in countering enemy reconnaissance efforts.

In 1995, he served in the Russian Federal Security Service, followed by the Federal Protective Service. In 2007, Alexei Dyumin became head of security of Prime Minister Viktor Zubkov.

In 2012, Dyumin became the deputy head of the Presidential Security Service.

In 2014 Dyumin became the deputy chief of the GRU, Russian special operations forces, which has played a key role in the Russian annexation of Crimea. According to the newspaper "Kommersant", Dyumin orchestrated the evacuation of Ukrainian President Viktor Yanukovych on February 23, 2014. Dyumin personally declined to comment on it and called all speculation as "myths".

Since 2015, Dyumin has served as Chief of Staff of the Russian Ground Forces and First Deputy Commander of the Russian Ground Forces.

On December 11, 2015, Dyumin was promoted to Lieutenant General.

On December 24, 2015, by decree of President Vladimir Putin, Lieutenant-General Alexei Dyumin was appointed Deputy of Defense Minister of Russia Sergey Shoygu.

According to Dyumin, he once saved Putin from a bear attack.

In April 2018, the United States imposed sanctions on him and 23 other Russian nationals.

Governor of Tula Oblast (2016–present)

Election

On February 2, 2016, President Vladimir Putin appointed Alexei Dyumin as Acting Governor of Tula Oblast. He succeeded Vladimir Gruzdev, who left the post at his own request. Dyumin assumed the duties of Governor of Tula Oblast on February 4, 2016. For Dyumin appointment was a surprise.

On February 9, 2016, Dyumin announced plans to participate in the gubernatorial election, which was held on September 18, 2016. He decided to run for Governor as an independent candidate, but he was supported by United Russia and the Liberal Democratic Party. Indeed, Tula Oblast became the only region in 2016 where United Russia did not hold a primary for the selection of a candidate for Governor.

Dyumin won the election with 84.17% of the vote.

Alexei Dyumin took office as Governor on 22 September 2016.

Governorship
On 29 November 2017, at the III Congress of Railway Workers, Governor Dyumin announced the upcoming construction of the high–speed railway Moscow — Tula as part of the promising high–speed railway "South" (Moscow — Rostov on Don — Adler). Since 2017, according to Dyumin, preparatory work has been launched with the participation of Russian Railways, all interested agencies, the President and the Prime Minister. Upon completion of the high speed rail link, the time required to cover the 194 km distance between Moscow and Tula will decrease from the current two hours to only 55 minutes.

In 2018, Alexei Dyumin entered the top 10 of Most Powerful Governors in Russia, taking 6th place.

Personal life

Family
Alexei Dyumin is married, wife Olga was born on 8 January 1977 in Moscow. Alexei Dyumin has a son Nikita, who is studying at school.

Hobbies
Alexei Dyumin plays amateur hockey, as a rule, in the position of goalkeeper. As an adviser included in the management of the hockey club SKA Saint Petersburg.

In October 2011, together with Roman Rotenberg and Gennady Timchenko, he participated in a charity friendly hockey match for the SKA Legends team.

On 7 October 2015, Dyumin participated in the Night Hockey League match, which took place in Sochi and was dedicated to the birthday of Russian President Vladimir Putin.

References

1972 births
Living people
Politicians from Kursk
Governors of Tula Oblast
Russian lieutenant generals
Heroes of the Russian Federation
Recipients of the Order "For Merit to the Fatherland"
Recipients of the Order of Courage
Russian individuals subject to the U.S. Department of the Treasury sanctions
Deputy Defence Ministers of Russia